The Way of Peace is a 1947 puppet animation film, financed by the Lutheran Church in America, giving a Christian view of life in the Atomic Age. It was directed by Frank Tashlin, produced by Wah Ming Chang, and narration read by Lew Ayres. In 2014, the film was named to the National Film Registry as being deemed  "culturally, historically, or aesthetically significant".

Premise
The film is a Christian parable about the end of the world in the Atomic Age told with puppet animation. Its scope is broad, from the creation of the world to the birth of Christ to the atomic destruction of the Earth.

Production background
Producer Wah Ming Chang was a well-known designer, and Lew Ayres was a famous actor who was a conscientious objector during World War II.
The Reverend H. K. Rasbach, a frequent adviser on big-budget films such as The Ten Commandments (1956) and The Greatest Story Ever Told (1965), provided technical supervision and story concept. 
The film premiered at Constitution Hall in Washington, D.C., with more than 2,700 in attendance, including members of Congress, representatives of the Supreme Court, and 750 leaders from various branches of government.

Television
This short premiered on WCBS-TV in New York on Easter Sunday, April 6, 1947 at 7:15 p.m.

See also
Atomic Age
List of American films of 1947 
Anti-war film

References

External links
The Way of Peace at IMDB
The Way of Peace on YouTube
The UCLA restored version also on YouTube

1947 films
United States National Film Registry films
1940s American animated films
Short films directed by Frank Tashlin
1940s stop-motion animated films
Films with screenplays by Frank Tashlin
Films about Christianity
1947 animated films
1940s English-language films